Tuszyński is a Polish surname with Tuszyńska feminine form. Notable people with the surname include:

Abraham Icek Tuschinski (born 1886, Polish spelling: Tuszyński), businessman of Jewish Polish descent
Agata Tuszynska (born 1957), Polish writer, poet and journalist. 
Bogdan Tuszyński (1932–2017), Polish journalist and historian
Jack Tuszyński (born 1956), Polish oncologist and physicist
Kamila Tuszyńska, researcher in media studies and comics theoretician. 
Patryk Tuszyński (born 1989), Polish footballer

Polish-language surnames